Toole is a surname that may refer to:

 F.X. Toole (1930–2002), American boxing trainer and author
 John Kennedy Toole (1937–1969), American novelist
  Annette O'Toole (born Toole; 1952), American actress, dancer, and singer-songwriter
 John Lawrence Toole (1830–1906), English comic actor and theatrical producer
 Joseph Toole (1851–1929), American politician from Montana; governor of Montana 1889–93
 K. Ross Toole (1920–1981), American historian and author
 Melinda Toole (contemporary), American beauty queen; Miss Alabama 2006
 Ottis Toole (1947–1996), American serial killer
 Steve Toole (1859–1919), American professional baseball player
 Zula Brown Toole (1868–1947), American newspaper publisher
 Paul Toole (1970- ), Deputy Premier of New South Wales

See also
 Tool (disambiguation)
 Toole County, Montana, a county in the United States
 Tooley, a surname
 Tulle, a commune in central France